The Mark 19 torpedo was an electric torpedo designed in 1942 by Westinghouse Electric as a follow-on development of the Mark 18 torpedo. The goal was to build a torpedo that incorporated all-electric controls in place of pneumatic controls. Its gyroscope and depth control were electrically controlled and operated, while the rudders were solenoid operated.

Further development of the Mark 19 was cancelled in favor of the Mark 26 torpedo.

See also
American 21 inch torpedo

References

Torpedoes
Torpedoes of the United States
Unmanned underwater vehicles